The Big Sandy Heritage Center Museum is located in Pikeville, Kentucky. The museum was housed in the old Chesapeake and Ohio Depot until 2015, when it moved to the 4th floor of the Judicial Annex in downtown Pikeville.

The museum portrays the people, places, and events that makes the area unique. Exhibits include the American Civil War, Hatfield-McCoy feud, Eastern Kentucky railways, the precolonial era, Pikeville Cut Through, domestic life, the Heritage Room, medicine, war, politics and coal mining. In 2015, the museum hosted the traveling exhibit, The Hatfields & McCoys: American Blood Feud, which was on loan from the West Virginia Humanities Council.

Current Hours (September 2021): Sunday: Closed, Monday: 10 am - 4 pm, Tuesday - Wednesday: Call for appointment, Thursday - Saturday: 10 am - 4 pm

References

External links
Big Sandy Heritage Center Website
Photo Gallery

Museums in Pike County, Kentucky
History museums in Kentucky
Pikeville, Kentucky